Robert Trelford McKenzie (11 September 1917 – 12 October 1981) was a Canadian  professor of politics and sociology, and a psephologist (one who does statistical analysis of elections). He is perhaps best known in Britain as one of the main presenters of the BBC's General Election programmes.

Early life
Born in Vancouver, British Columbia, Canada, the son of William Meldrum McKenzie and Frances (née) Chapman, he was educated at King Edward High School and the University of British Columbia from which he graduated with a BA. He was a lecturer at the same university from 1937 to 1942. In 1943, he joined the Canadian Army and a year later, with the rank of captain, was sent to London where he remained for the rest of his working life.  Leaving the services three years later, McKenzie enrolled at the London School of Economics to study for a doctorate. In 1949, he was given a sociology lectureship, and was promoted to professor in 1964.

Television
He was widely known in the UK for his televised reports on general election results as they were announced on the BBC. He is popularly associated with the swingometer device used in such broadcasts. The swingometer was first introduced in 1955 by Peter Milne, and was later refined by McKenzie and David Butler and used nationally in the 1959 General election for the BBC. At first Butler used the meter, but in 1964 McKenzie enthusiastically took over. He appeared on all BBC election nights from 1955 to 1979, and was later replaced by Peter Snow in 1983 due to McKenzie's death in 1981. In 1980, he introduced and moderated the discussions in each episode of Milton Friedman's television series Free to Choose.

McKenzie famously interviewed Lord Hailsham on the BBC programme Gallery in 1963, asking questions on the then recent scandal involving Conservative cabinet minister John Profumo. Hailsham became increasingly fractious as the interview progressed regarding McKenzie's line of questioning, even though Hailsham was strongly critical of Profumo's conduct.

Other work

He wrote many academic books and papers during his career, including British Political Parties: The Distribution of Power within the Conservative and Labour Parties and Angels in Marble: Working Class Conservatives in Urban England, but it was through television and radio that his name became known. His broadcasting career began when he was requested by the BBC to give occasional talks on the Overseas Service; he was later invited to become involved in dramatic radio and TV, such as appearing as himself on an episode of the British series Yes Minister.

Death

McKenzie died from cancer in 1981.

Publications

British Political Parties : The Distribution of Power Within the Conservative and Labour Parties, 1955; 2nd ed., 1963.
Angels in Marble: Working Class Conservativism in Urban England (with Allan Silver), 1968.

See also
 Richard Dimbleby
 David Dimbleby
 David Butler

Notes

External links
Entry about McKenzie from the London School of Economics
BBC Archive - Swingometer
British Political Parties — Thirty Years after Robert McKenzie
Don't mean a thing if it ain't got that swing

1917 births
1981 deaths
Psephologists
Deaths from cancer
Canadian sociologists
Canadian military personnel from British Columbia
BBC television presenters
Academics of the London School of Economics
Academic staff of the University of British Columbia
People from Auckland
New Zealand emigrants to Canada
Canadian emigrants to England
Canadian Army personnel of World War II
Canadian Army officers